Bais Hatalmud is a Yeshiva in Jerusalem founded and headed by Rabbi Dov Schwartzman. The current Rosh yeshiva is Rabbi Schwartzman's son-in-law, Rabbi Yosef Strasser.

The yeshiva is located in the Sanhedria Murhevet neighborhood. There is an alumni association in Canada.

References

Orthodox yeshivas in Jerusalem